Savvas Moudouroglou (born 15 December 1991) is a Greek forward currently playing for Ethnikos Piraeus.

Career

Ethnikos Piraeus
On 7 October 2019 it was confirmed, that Moudouroglou had joined Gamma Ethniki club Ethnikos Piraeus.

References

External links
Profile at epae.org
Profile at Onsports.gr

1991 births
Living people
Greek footballers
Niki Volos F.C. players
Doxa Drama F.C. players
Panthrakikos F.C. players
Aiolikos F.C. players
Ethnikos Piraeus F.C. players
Gamma Ethniki players
Football League (Greece) players
Super League Greece players
Association football forwards
Footballers from Drama, Greece